Tan Yujiao (born October 4, 1990, in Shaoshan) is a Chinese powerlifter. She won the gold medal at the Women's 67 kg event at the 2016 Summer Paralympics, with 135 kilograms.

She also won the gold medal in the women's 67 kg event at the 2020 Summer Paralympics held in Tokyo, Japan. A few months later, she won the silver medal in her event at the 2021 World Para Powerlifting Championships held in Tbilisi, Georgia.

References

External links
 

1990 births
Living people
Chinese powerlifters
Female powerlifters
Paralympic powerlifters of China
Paralympic gold medalists for China
Paralympic silver medalists for China
Paralympic medalists in powerlifting
Powerlifters at the 2012 Summer Paralympics
Powerlifters at the 2016 Summer Paralympics
Powerlifters at the 2020 Summer Paralympics
Medalists at the 2012 Summer Paralympics
Medalists at the 2016 Summer Paralympics
Medalists at the 2020 Summer Paralympics
21st-century Chinese women